Spirit Camera: The Cursed Memoir is a spin-off game in the Fatal Frame series, co-developed by Tecmo Koei and Nintendo for the Nintendo 3DS. The game comes with an "AR notebook", the titular Diary of Faces, which the player uses in conjunction with the game. It was released in 2012 for Japan on January 12; in North America on April 13; and in Europe on June 29.

Gameplay

Spirit Camera utilizes the capabilities of the Nintendo 3DS, which acts as the game's Camera Obscura, the signature "weapon" of the Fatal Frame series. The game uses the gyro sensors and 3D cameras to create a "visceral" gaming experience.

In the game's story and most minigame modes, ghosts will appear in the player's environment, and will try to attack them. The player must use the Camera Obscura's abilities to damage and defeat these spirits by photographing them with the L and R buttons. The player must turn in all directions, as spirits hit by the camera will vanish and reappear beside or behind the player a few seconds later. Spirit Power, used for extra damage, can be charged by keeping the spirit within the camera reticle to charge the meter. The default Zero Lens is the only lens in the game that charges Spirit Power; all other lenses (mainly used for investigation) do not have this ability, though they can still be used in battle. Regardless of lenses, players can still halt a spirit's attack by shooting when the camera reticle turns red.

The game has three different modes. The main story mode, during which the plot progresses. The player finds the Diary of Faces and allows Maya to escape from it. In this mode, the player must use the 3DS cameras, serving as the Camera Obscura, to find hints within the diary and battle ghosts in the real world environment around them. In Haunted Visions, the player completes three challenges. In Cursed Pages, the player plays four minigames.

Plot 
The game is set in the player's reality, as well as inside an old, Japanese-styled house where many human spirits are trapped. The diary acts as an "AR notebook", used with the 3DS to generally progress the storyline. The player encounters several ghosts throughout the game. One of them is Maya, a girl with no memory except her name, and who accompanies the player throughout the game. Hostile ghosts include: Kaito Hasebe, a man trapped by the Diary, now driven insane; Koji, also known as "the Masked Boy", who challenges the player to a "game" of hide-and-seek; and the "Woman in Black", the primary antagonist of the game.

Another Story is a Japan-exclusive prequel story to Spirit Camera: The Cursed Memoir. The story, released on the website, provides context on certain characters' backgrounds. In the story, the narrator, is a high school student intrigued by the rumored Diary of Faces. She encounters her substitute teacher's older brother, Kaito Hasebe. He is apparently search for leads on the rumored Diary of Faces; he warns Yuuko to not investigate, indicating that he has already been cursed. Yuuko does not see him again. Some time later, Yuuko and her friend  discuss some stories they have heard about the Diary, such as those of a masked boy, a woman who has turned into a doll, and an Old Woman with sharp needles chanting an incantation. One day, Yuuko briefly sees a person's shadow standing amongst the purple clematis flowers in the school courtyard. From the next day on, Yoriko abruptly stops coming to school. Yuuko, assuming that her friend is sick, heads to the library to do more research. There, she senses someone staring at her, and turns to catch a glimpse of Yoriko standing between the bookshelves. Yuuko rushes over to her, but Yoriko disappears, leaving behind a book with a purple cover—the Diary of Faces. Yuuko narrates that after an undisclosed period of time, Yoriko was found, presumably with her face taken. She wonders if she dragged her friend into this, but supposes that this would have happened anyway, since no one involved with the diary can escape. In the epilogue, two unnamed students talk about the Diary, with one mentioning that the Diary has come to Yuuko.

Plot
The player, as the game's protagonist, receives the cursed "Diary of Faces" in an unmarked package. Upon seeing the first page through a dual-lensed variant of the "Camera Obscura" (the 3DS outer cameras), the player is taken into an old house. Maya encounters and stops the player from entering one of the doors, and they are brought out of the house and back into the player's world. Upon returning, Maya explains that the person beyond the door is the "Woman in Black", who takes the faces of people who become trapped by the diary. Maya and the player begin to investigate the diary, in order to discover its secrets and for Maya to regain her memory.

As the two investigate, they learn about the Tokoyomi Ritual. A dark Shinto ritual, it involves sewing up a maiden's eyes and mouth, making her a spiritual vessel. To ensure that the captured spirit, be it good or evil, does not escape, the maiden must have no earthly attachments—that is, she cannot share a single bond with other people. The last time the ritual was performed, the village it occurred in was soon engulfed by darkness. Initially, Maya believes that the Woman in Black is the maiden from the final ritual. However, after delving further in, they soon realize that the maiden was actually Maya. They discover that, through the purple diary, she had shared a sisterly bond to "another" Maya—the Woman in Black. As a result, the ritual knocked Maya unconscious and, through their bond, "awakened" the other Maya, corrupting her.

When the Woman in Black catches and takes Maya, the player uses the Camera Obscura to enter the diary to both save Maya and break the curse. After a gruelling battle, Maya breaks free of the Woman in Black. The other Maya begins to sob, begging the real Maya not to leave her again. As they saw each other as family, Maya promises her that she'll never leave her again. The diary returns the player to reality and frees the souls of the previous victims of the curse and the villagers, leaving them one last message: "Thank you".

Development

Reception

The game received "mixed" reviews, according to video game review aggregator Metacritic. Gamesbeat thought the game lacked content.

Explanatory notes

References

External links

 Official website (Japan)
 Official website (America) 
 Official website (Europe)
 Spirit Camera: The Cursed Memoir at MobyGames

2012 video games
2010s horror video games
Augmented reality
Fatal Frame games
First-person adventure games
Koei Tecmo games
Music in fiction
Nintendo 3DS games
Nintendo 3DS-only games
Nintendo games
Psychological horror games
Fiction about sacrifices
Single-player video games
Video game spin-offs
Video games about amnesia
Video games about revenge
Video games developed in Japan